Naxos or Naxus was a town of ancient Crete, according to the Scholiast (ad Pind. Isth. vi. 107) celebrated for its whetstones. Some classicists have doubted the existence of this city. The islands Crete and Naxos were famed for their whetstones (Plin. xxxvi. 22; xviii. 28), hence the confusion.  

Modern scholarship and archaeology seem to confirm its existence.  Naxos was located near the ancient city of Olous, atop a mountain now called Oxa where ruins can still be found.

See also 
 List of ancient Greek cities

References

Cities in ancient Crete
Geography of Crete
Ruins in Greece
Former populated places in Greece
Populated places in ancient Crete